Sir Henry Browne Hayes (1762–1832) was an Irish-born convict, transported to New South Wales.

Hayes was born in Ireland, the son of Attiwell Hayes (d.1799) a wealthy brewer and miller. Henry Browne Hayes was admitted a freeman of the city of Cork in November 1782, was one of the sheriffs in 1790, and in that year was knighted. Following the death of his wife, he became acquainted with Miss Mary Pike, heiress to over £20,000. On 22 July 1797, he abducted her and took her to his house at Vernon Mount near Douglas. In spite of Miss Pike's protestations, a man dressed as a priest was brought in who went through a form of a marriage ceremony. Miss Pike refused to consider it a marriage, and was eventually rescued by some of her relatives. Hayes fled, and a reward of £1000 was offered for his apprehension.

Hayes was not found until two years later, when he walked into the shop of an old friend of the family, and suggested that he might as well get the reward. The trial - which did not begin until April 1801 - created much interest. Hayes was found guilty and recommended to mercy. At first condemned to death, his sentence was commuted to transportation for life. Sailing on the Atlas, Hayes arrived at Sydney on 6 July 1802. Hayes was not short of money and had lightened the privations of the voyage by paying the captain a considerable sum so that he might mess with him. Unfortunately for himself he quarrelled with Surgeon Thomas Jamison who was on the same vessel, and when Hayes arrived he was sentenced to six months imprisonment "for his threatening and improper conduct". Hayes made himself a nuisance to Governor King by consorting with the wilder spirits among the Irish convicts, and by trying to form a freemason's lodge after permission to hold a meeting for this purpose had been refused. King called him "a restless, troublesome character". In 1803 he purchased a property near the city and called it Vaucluse. This afterwards belonged to William Wentworth. Hayes surrounded his property with turf from Ireland to keep out the snakes which were common in the area; the tactic appeared to work. When the troubles between the military and Governor Bligh began, Hayes took the side of the governor and was sent to the coal mines at Newcastle.

Bligh would have pardoned him if he could have obtained possession of the great seal, and after Macquarie came Hayes was pardoned in 1812. He then sailed to Europe in the same vessel, the Isabella,  with Joseph Holt; an account of their shipwreck can be found in the Memoirs of Joseph Holt. Hayes lived in retirement in Ireland for nearly 20 years, and died in April or May 1832 aged 70 years. He was buried in the crypt of Christ Church, Cork.

A 2017 play, titled Sir Henry, was based on the life of Hayes.

References

1762 births
1832 deaths
Knights Bachelor
People from County Cork
18th-century Irish people
Convicts transported to Australia